Tuần Giáo is a rural district of Điện Biên province in the Northwest region of Vietnam. As of 2006, the district had a population of 71,423. The district covers an area of 1,136.29 km². The district capital lies at Tuần Giáo.

On 24 June 1983, a 6.7 earthquake occurred in Tuần Giáo at around 14:00 local time, 11 km northeast of Tuần Giáo townlet, causing heavy losses to the Tuần Giáo district and surrounding areas. After the event, a series of aftershocks occurred, with the largest occurring on 15 July 1983 with a magnitude of 5.4.

In 2006, a portion of the district was carved out to form Mường Ảng district.

Administrative divisions

Tuan Giao has 14 administrative units, including 1 town and 13 communes:

Tuần Giáo (town)
 Chiềng Sinh
 Mùn Chung
 Mường Mùn
 Mường Thín
 Nà Sáy
 Phình Sáng
 Pú Nhung
 Quài Cang
 Quài Nưa
 Quài Tở
 Ta Ma
 Tênh Phông
 Tỏa Tình

References

Districts of Điện Biên province
Điện Biên province